Osvaldo de Jesus Serra Van-Dúnem (8 August 1950 – 4 February 2006) was an Angolan politician and diplomat. His surname is of Flemish origin, from the well known Angolan Family, "the Van-Dúnem family". He was appointed Interior Minister on 16 December 2002 by  Prime Minister Fernando da Piedade Dias dos Santos.
 
From 1999 to 2002, he was the ambassador of Angola to Portugal. He left this post to become the minister. In May 2006, Van-Dúnem died while visiting Brazil.

References

Angolan diplomats
1950 births
2006 deaths
Interior ministers of Angola
Youth and Sports ministers of Angola
Ambassadors of Angola to Brazil
Ambassadors of Angola to Portugal
Governors of Huambo